The Lịch sử nước An Nam (History of Annam) is a history text written by Benedict Thiện in 1659, covering the history of Vietnam from early mythology to the year 1593.

Benedict Thiện was a Vietnamese Catholic pastor and a member of the Society of Jesus in 17th-century Hanoi. He summarised Vietnamese royal chronicles with information about geography, culture, religions and churches. He finished the book in 1659, written in the Vietnamese alphabet. He presented the book to his superior bishop Giovanni Filippo de Marini, who then left Vietnam in 1661. It had no title, and later was named and regarded as Lịch sử nước An Nam by bishop Đỗ Quang Chính.

The original manuscript is currently stored inside Vatican Library, Holy See.

References

Work cited

 

1659 books
History books about Vietnam
17th-century history books